SM U-15 or U-XV was a  or U-boat of the Austro-Hungarian Navy ( or ) during World War I. U-15 was constructed in Germany and shipped by rail to Pola where she was assembled and launched in April 1915. She was commissioned in October 1915. U-15 was the most successful boat of the U-10 class, sinking six ships totaling  and 745 tons. The boat survived the war and was handed over to Italy as a war reparation and scrapped in 1920.

Design and construction 
U-15 was constructed at AG Weser in Bremen for the Austro-Hungarian Navy and then shipped by rail in sections to the navy yard at Pola, where the sections were riveted together. Though there is no specific mention of how long it took for U-15s sections to be assembled, a sister boat, the German Type UB I submarine UB-3, shipped to Pola from Germany in mid-April 1915, was assembled in about two weeks. U-15 was launched in April.

U-15 was a small, coastal submarine that displaced  surfaced and  submerged. She featured a single shaft, a single  Daimler diesel engine for surface running, and a single  electric motor for submerged travel. She was designed for a crew of 17 officers and men.

U-15 was equipped with two  torpedo tubes located in the front and carried a complement of two torpedoes. In October 1916, U-15s armament was supplemented with a 37 mm/23 (1.5 in) quick-firing (QF) gun. This gun was replaced by a /33 QF gun in November 1917.

Operational history 
SM U-15 was commissioned into the Austro-Hungarian Navy on 6 October under the command of Linienschiffsleutnant Friedrich Schlosser. On 28 November, Linienschiffsleutnant Friedrich Fähndrich was assigned to the first of two stints in command of the boat. On 18 December, Fähndrich and U-15 attacked and sank two Albanian sailing vessels near Lezhë.
After being relieved by Linienschiffsleutnant Franz Rzemenowsky von Trautenegg from late March to early May 1916, Fähndrich resumed command on 10 May.

The following month, Fähndrich and the crew of U-15 scored their second double kill when they sank the Italian auxiliary cruiser  and the French destroyer Fourche (745 tons). The escorting destroyer Fourche began a depth charge attack on U-15 and assumed success when an oil slick appeared on the surface. After the captain of Fourche turned his attentions to the rescue Cittá di Messinas survivors, U-15 launched a single torpedo that struck Fourche amidships and sank her.

On 25 October, U-15, back under the command of von Trautenegg, sank the  Italian steamer , a sister ship to Stura (sunk by U-15 in May). Polcevera was the last ship sunk by U-15.

From October 1916 to the end of the fighting in November 1918, U-15s activities are unknown. U-15 was at Pola at the end of the war when Austria-Hungary handed her over to Italy. U-15 was scrapped at Pola by 1920.

Summary of raiding history

Notes

References

Bibliography 

 

 
 
 
 
 
 

U-10-class submarines
Ships built in Bremen (state)
Ships built in Pola
U-boats commissioned in 1915
World War I submarines of Austria-Hungary